Leonardo González Feliz (born 16 November 1962), better known as Leo Harlem, is a Spanish comedian and late-blooming actor.

Biography 
Following a participation in a  monologue contest in 2001, he moved to Madrid to pursue a career as a comedian.

He made his feature film debut as an actor at age 52, featuring in a cameo performance in Santiago Segura's Torrente 5: Operación Eurovegas. After featuring in A Stroke of Luck in a supporting role playing the Mayor of the village where the fiction takes place in, Harlem landed his first lead role in 2018 comedy The Best Summer of My Life, playing Curro, a sleazy salesman who promises his son an unforgettable vacation.

Filmography

References 

Spanish stand-up comedians
21st-century Spanish male actors
Male actors from Castile and León
People from Valladolid
1962 births
Living people